Patterson Peak at  above sea level is a peak in the White Cloud Mountains of Idaho. Glacier, Rock, Emerald, and Cornice lakes are in the basin to the northeast of the peak.

References 

Mountains of Custer County, Idaho
Mountains of Idaho
Sawtooth National Forest